Fahad Hazza Al Hamad Al Fahad (born 1 December 1983) is a Kuwaiti former footballer who played as a forward.

References

1983 births
Living people
Kuwaiti footballers
Sportspeople from Kuwait City
Association football forwards
Kuwait international footballers
Kazma SC players
Al-Nahda Club (Oman) players
Al Salmiya SC players
Kuwait Premier League players
Oman Professional League players
Expatriate footballers in Oman
Kuwaiti expatriate footballers
Kuwaiti expatriate sportspeople in Oman